Parmelina is a genus of lichen belonging to the family Parmeliaceae. The genus was circumscribed in 1974 by American lichenologist Mason Hale with Parmelina tiliacea assigned as the type species.

Species
Parmelina atricha 
Parmelina carporrhizans 
Parmelina coleae 
Parmelina cryptotiliacea 
Parmelina gyrophorica 
Parmelina kanakia 
Parmelina pastillifera 
Parmelina quercina 
Parmelina tiliacea 
Parmelina yalungana 

All species of Parmelina with a Australasian-South African distribution were transferred to the new genus Austroparmelina in 2010.

References

Parmeliaceae
Lichen genera
Taxa named by Mason Hale
Lecanorales genera